Rahul Pandey (Devanagari: राहुल पाण्डेय) is an Indian Bollywood Playback singer and Songwriter. He debuted in the Indian Film industry with the song Haseena Tu kameena Mein from the movie Happy Ending in 2014. In 2015 he sang the song Jab We Met from the movie Hero.
Rahul Pandey sang two songs,  Feel The Rhythm & Show Me Your Moves  in Tiger Shroff starrer  'Munna Michael' (2017)

Early life
Rahul Pandey was born to Mr. Hirdesh Pandey & Mrs. Renu Pandey in Kolkata, West Bengal. He did his early schooling from Birla High School, Kolkata and then finished his college studies from St. Xavier's College, Kolkata. For Post-graduation, he moved to Mumbai to pursue business management from IIPM, Mumbai. He is an MBA in Marketing. After completing MBA, Rahul worked with an MNC for a year and then joined a production house as the Brand Manager. After this, he got into music full-time and started chasing his dream of becoming a playback singer in 2012.

Career
Rahul Pandey debuted with the Bollywood hit song Haseena tu kameena mein from the 2014 romantic comedy Hindi film Happy Ending. Rahul thereafter sang the song Jab We Met from the movie Hero. Rahul has also sung Telugu hits like Hey Akhil from the movie Akhil – The Power Of Jua and the song Alare Aala from the movie Soukhyam. 
Rahul also sang two songs Feel The Rhythm and Show Me Your Moves in Tiger Shroff starrer Munna Michael. Rahul has recently performed at Waltair Park, Vizag and rocked the show.

Discography

Non Film Songs

References

External links
 
 
 
 Official Website

Bollywood playback singers
Singers from Kolkata
Living people
1984 births
Indian male playback singers
Indian guitarists
Indian record producers
Indian Institute of Planning and Management alumni
University of Calcutta alumni
21st-century guitarists
21st-century Indian male singers
21st-century Indian singers